The Toyota U engine is a series of flat engines produced by Toyota. The original version of this engine was produced in the 1960s and 1970s in flat-twin configuration. The engine series was extended in 2012 for the engine derived from the Subaru flat-four for the Toyota 86.



U

The 697 cc U was produced from 1961 through 1966. It was exclusively installed in the Toyota Publica family of vehicles.

2U

The 790 cc 2U was produced from 1965 through 1969, while the similar 2U-B was produced from 1966 through 1976. When installed in the Toyota MiniAce (UP100) minitruck and bus series, the engine only produces  at 4,600 rpm. This version has an 8.2:1 compression ratio. The 2U-C used in some models of the Publica 20 series produced  at 5,000 rpm. It was also installed in the Publica-derived sports car, called the Toyota Sports 800.

4U

The engine is a Subaru designed-and-built flat-four engine called the FA20D, with a Toyota engine code. The engine is built at Subaru's Oizumi Plant in Ota, Gunma. The compression ratio is 12.5:1. In 2016, for the 2017 model year, power was increased to  when equipped with a manual transmission.

The 4U-GSE was discontinued in 2021, following the introduction of the second-generation Toyota 86 (also known as the Toyota GR86) and Subaru BRZ, which uses a 2.4-liter FA24D. Unlike the FA20, it does not use a Toyota engine code.

See also

 List of Toyota engines
 Flat engine

References

External links

 Photo of the 2U engine
 JDM Spec Engines - Toyota 4U-GSE Engine

U
Boxer engines
Gasoline engines by model